The 1969 Oakland Athletics season involved the A's compiling a record of 88 wins and 74 losses. With its expansion to 12 teams in 1969, the American League had been divided into two 6-team divisions. In their first year in the newly established American League West, the Athletics finished second, nine games behind the Minnesota Twins. It was the first time they had finished in the first division since 1952. Paid attendance for the season was 778,232.

Offseason 
 October 15, 1968: Joe Keough was drafted from the Athletics by the Kansas City Royals as the 8th pick in the 1968 MLB expansion draft.
 December 2, 1968: Darrell Evans was drafted from the Athletics by the Atlanta Braves in the 1968 rule 5 draft.

Regular season 
Reggie Jackson hit 47 home runs in 1969, and was briefly ahead of the pace that Roger Maris set when he broke the single-season record for home runs with 61 in 1961, and that of Babe Ruth when he set the previous record of 60 in 1927.
The club ranked second in the American League Western division. With 13 games left in the season, Hank Bauer was replaced as Field Manager by John McNamara. McNamara compiled a won loss record of 8–5 to help the A's finish with 88 wins and 74 losses, an improvement of six wins compared to the previous season.

Season standings

Record vs. opponents

Opening Day starters 
Sal Bando
Bert Campaneris
Danny Cater
Dave Duncan
Dick Green
Mike Hershberger
Reggie Jackson
Rick Monday
Blue Moon Odom

Notable transactions 
 June 5, 1969: 1969 Major League Baseball Draft (June Draft) notable picks:
Round 1: Don Stanhouse (9th pick).
Round 2: Tommy Sandt
Round 3: Steve Lawson
Round 6: Jim Sundberg (did not sign)
Round 8: Glenn Abbott
Round 13: John Stearns (did not sign)
Round 19: Charlie Chant
 June 14, 1969: John Donaldson was traded by the Athletics to the Seattle Pilots for Larry Haney.

Reggie Jackson
In the offseason, Jackson demanded a salary increase from $10,000 to $25,000. Jackson would settle at $20,000. Reggie Jackson hit two home runs versus the Washington Senators, with President Richard Nixon in the crowd. By July 1, the A's had played in 71 games and Jackson had hit 30 home runs, 62 RBI, .287 batting average and a 1.145 OPS. On July 2, Reggie Jackson would hit three home runs versus the Seattle Pilots to raise his season total to 34 home runs. He was on pace to break the home run record set by Roger Maris eight years earlier. By the end of July, Jackson had 40 home runs but he only hit 5 home runs in August. In September, Jackson was hospitalized with a skin rash and was only able to hit 2 home runs. Jackson still managed to lead the American League with 123 runs scored.

Roster

Player stats

Batting

Starters by position 
Note: Pos = Position; G = Games played; AB = At bats; H = Hits; Avg. = Batting average; HR = Home runs; RBI = Runs batted in

Other batters 
Note: G = Games played; AB = At bats; H = Hits; Avg. = Batting average; HR = Home runs; RBI = Runs batted in

Pitching

Starting pitchers 
Note: G = Games pitched; IP = Innings pitched; W = Wins; L = Losses; ERA = Earned run average; SO = Strikeouts

Other pitchers 
Note: G = Games pitched; IP = Innings pitched; W = Wins; L = Losses; ERA = Earned run average; SO = Strikeouts

Relief pitchers 
Note: G = Games pitched; W = Wins; L = Losses; SV = Saves; ERA = Earned run average; SO = Strikeouts

Farm system

References

External links
1969 Oakland Athletics team page at Baseball Reference
1969 Oakland Athletics team page at www.baseball-almanac.com

Oakland Athletics seasons
Oakland Athletics season
1969 in sports in California